The 1920 Louisiana Industrial football team was an American football team that represented the Louisiana Industrial Institute—now known as Louisiana Tech University—as a member of the Louisiana Intercollegiate Athletic Association (LIAA) during the 1920 college football season. Led by first-year head coach R. Foster Clark, Louisiana Industrial compiled an overall record of 5–1. Bob Seegers was the team's captain.

Schedule

References

Louisiana Industrial
Louisiana Tech Bulldogs football seasons
Louisiana Industrial football